The Roy C. and Lena (Johnson) Seaman House is a historic building located in Cherokee, Iowa, United States. The 1½-story, frame, American Craftsman style Bungalow was completed in 1913. The exterior features a side-gabled roof that extends over the full-width front porch. Of particular note are the decorative field or river stones that are utilized in the porch and the chimney, typical of the Craftsman style. Other decorative elements on the exterior include rafter tails on the porch and above the shed-roofed dormer windows. Much of the original woodwork has been maintained in the interior of the house. Faux timbers extend across the living room and the dining room ceilings. The interior also features built-in cabinets and a brick fireplace. The house was listed on the National Register of Historic Places in 2019.

References

Houses completed in 1913
Bungalow architecture in Iowa
Cherokee, Iowa
Houses in Cherokee County, Iowa
Houses on the National Register of Historic Places in Iowa
National Register of Historic Places in Cherokee County, Iowa